The Progressive National Movement (Spanish: Movimiento Nacional Progresista) is a progressive political party in Colombia. 
In the legislative elections, 10 March 2002, the party won as one of the many small parties participating in parliamentary representation. The party took part in the parliamentary elections of 2006, in which it won 1 out of 166 deputies and no senators. The party was of little significance in the 14 March 2010 elections.

Progressive parties in Colombia